Mulawarman Stadium is a multi-purpose stadium in Bontang, Indonesia. It is used mostly for football matches and is used as the home stadium for Bontang FC. The stadium has a capacity of 12,000 people.

References

Sports venues in Indonesia
Football venues in Indonesia
Buildings and structures in East Kalimantan
Sport in East Kalimantan
Bontang